Solomon Lake is a lake in Kandiyohi County, in the U.S. state of Minnesota.

Solomon Lake was named for Solomon R. Foot, a pioneer for whom Foot Lake was also named.

See also
List of lakes in Minnesota

References

Lakes of Minnesota
Lakes of Kandiyohi County, Minnesota